Cape Breton—The Sydneys was a federal electoral district in Nova Scotia, Canada, that was represented in the House of Commons of Canada from 1968 to 1997.

This riding was created in 1966 from Cape Breton South. It consisted initially of part of the county of Cape Breton, including the city of Sydney. In 1987, it was redefined to consist of parts of the Counties of Inverness, Victoria and Cape Breton including the City of Sydney. It was abolished in 1996 when it was merged into Sydney—Victoria.

Members of Parliament 

This riding elected the following Members of Parliament:

Election results

See also 

 List of Canadian federal electoral districts
 Past Canadian electoral districts

External links 
 Riding history for Cape Breton—The Sydneys (1966–1987) from the Library of Parliament
 Riding history for Cape Breton—The Sydneys (1987–1996) from the Library of Parliament

Former federal electoral districts of Nova Scotia
Politics of the Cape Breton Regional Municipality
Victoria County, Nova Scotia